Earswick is a village and civil parish in the unitary authority of the City of York in North Yorkshire, England.

According to the 2001 census the parish had a population of 819, increasing to 876 at the 2011 Census.

The village was historically part of the North Riding of Yorkshire until 1974. It was then a part of the district of Ryedale in North Yorkshire from 1974 until 1996. Since 1996 it has been part of the City of York unitary authority.

References

External links 

Earswick Village Website

Villages in North Yorkshire
Villages and areas in the City of York
Civil parishes in North Yorkshire